VfL Gummersbach  is a handball club from the German city of Gummersbach. Currently, VfL Gummersbach competes in the Handball-Bundesliga and the DHB-Pokal. The club has seen great success, especially from the late 1960s until the early 1990s.

Crest, colours, supporters

Kits

Accomplishments

1. Handball-Bundesliga: 12
: 1966, 1967, 1969, 1973, 1974, 1975, 1976, 1982, 1983, 1985, 1988, 1991
2. Handball-Bundesliga: 1
: 2022
DHB-Pokal:
: 1978, 1979, 1982, 1983, 1985
EHF Champions League:
: 1967, 1970, 1971, 1974, 1983
EHF Champions League Finalists:
: 1972
EHF Cup Winner's Cup:
: 1978, 1979, 2010, 2011
EHF Cup:
: 1982, 2009
European Club Championship:
: 1979, 1983
European Club Championship Finalists:
: 2006
 Double
 Winners (3): 1981–82, 1982–83, 1984–85

Team

Current squad
Squad for the 2022–23 season

GK
1  Martin Nagy
 12  Fabian Norsten
 16  Tibor Ivanišević
 20  Oskar Knudsen
LW
5  Tilen Kodrin
 28  Hákon Daði Styrmisson
RW
8  Lukas Blohme
 11  Mathis Häseler
LP
4  Elliði Snær Viðarsson
 40  Jonas Stüber
 53  Bruno Eickhoff
 66  Štěpán Zeman

LB
7  Julian Köster
 15  Miro Schluroff
CB
3  Julius Fanger
 21  Dominik Mappes
 23  Ole Pregler
 30  Tom Kiesler
RB
 10  Finn Schroven
 24  Nemanja Zelenović
 44  Tom Jansen

Notable players

Coaching history
 Petre Ivănescu
 Velimir Kljaić
 Sead Hasanefendić

External links
 Official website

German handball clubs
Handball-Bundesliga
Handball clubs established in 1861
1861 establishments in Germany
Sport in North Rhine-Westphalia